Framed! A Sicilian Murder Mystery is a 2022 Italian television series starring the comedy duo Ficarra and Picone. The first season was released in Italy on Netflix on January 1 2022, and internationally on January 27 2022, and the second season was released on 2 March 2023.

Cast
 Salvatore Ficarra as Salvatore
 Valentino Picone as Valentino
 Marianna Di Martino as Agata
 Anna Favella as Ester
 Leo Gullotta as Nicolosi
 Sergio Friscia as Sergione
 Tony Sperandeo as Tonino Macaluso
 Maurizio Marchetti as Martorana
 Filippo Luna as Lo Russo
 Domenico Centamore as Don Lorenzo
 Sasà Salvaggio as Alberto Gambino

References

External links
 
 

2020s Italian drama television series
Crime comedy television series
Italian-language Netflix original programming
Italian crime television series
Italian comedy television series
Television series about organized crime